Bessie Lyle Hatton (22 November 1867 – 25 March 1964) was an English actress, playwright, journalist, and feminist, and took part in the struggle for women's suffrage in the United Kingdom.

Life
Hatton was born on 22 November 1867 in Claines, Worcestershire. Her father was Joseph Hatton, a novelist and journalist, and her mother was Louisa Johnson, her elder brother was explorer Frank Hatton. She was educated at a convent school in Ardennes and at Bedford College, London, however she left college to join Frank Benson's company who were performing Shakespeare. She performed in Judah at the Shaftesbury Theatre with Gertrude Warden in 1890.

On the advice of her father and despite her concerns that it might interfere with her acting career, Hatton authored several popular works of fiction, including The Village of Youth and Other Fairytales (1895) and her play Before Sunrise. This play was staged at the Royal Albert Hall on 11 December 1909 for the Women's Freedom League.

In June 1908 she and fellow actress and writer Cicely Mary Hamilton founded the Women Writers' Suffrage League. The organisation was open to both men and women, and each affiliation. Hatton was the organising secretary, took part in events, and organised entertainment for the suffrage meetings.

When World War I broke out, The Women Writers Suffrage League helped establish a library at Endell Street Military Hospital, and helped organise recreation at the hospital. Hatton never married, and would go on to die on 25 March 1964.

References

External links 
Anna Andes analyses 'Before Sunrise' in her essay 'Burgeoning New Women of Suffrage Drama: Envisioning an Autonomous Self' http://www.thelatchkey.org/Latchkey6/essay/Andes.htm in The Latchkey: Journal of New Women Studies

20th-century English novelists
English suffragists
English feminists
English feminist writers
English stage actresses
English women dramatists and playwrights
English women novelists
Women of the Victorian era
British women travel writers
British travel writers
Women science fiction and fantasy writers
20th-century English women writers
Year of death unknown
1867 births